Tacoronte is a city and municipality of Tenerife, Canary Islands, Spain. It is located in the north-east of the island. Mostly rural, the municipality stretches for 30 square kilometers from the volcanic peaks that rise in the center of the island to the Atlantic shore.  The municipality seat, also called Tacoronte, lies about 16 km west of the capital, Santa Cruz de Tenerife. Old manorial houses and farms are situated here, as well as vineyards that produce the wine known as Tacoronte-Acentejo.

The TF-5 motorway passes through the municipality. The Tenerife North Airport is 4 km to the east.

Tacoronte is a toponym of Guanche origin, believed to be derived from Tagoror, meaning "place where the Council of Elders meets".  Its territory constituted an ancient menceyato, as the Guanche kingdoms were known, ruled by the mencey Acaymo.  After the Spanish conquest of Tenerife, the area was settled by the Portuguese Sebastián Machado, who founded the town of Tacoronte around the hermitage of Santa Catalina that he had built.  The town grew during succeeding centuries and in 1911, Alfonso XIII of Spain granted the town the status of municipio.

Notable people
 María Rosa Alonso (1909–2011), Spanish professor, philologist, essayist
 Lorenzo Javier Jorge (born 1984), kickboxer

See also
List of municipalities in Santa Cruz de Tenerife

References

External links
Official website
Tacoronte Guide

Municipalities in Tenerife